Getting Together is an American musical sitcom that aired on ABC during the 1971–72 U.S. television season. It starred Bobby Sherman and Wes Stern as Bobby Conway and Lionel Poindexter, a songwriting duo. The pilot for the series had aired the previous spring as the first-season finale episode of The Partridge Family named "A Knight in Shining Armor", in which Lionel and Bobby were introduced to each other by the Partridges. The unaired version of this episode, entitled "Words And Music", ran 33 minutes, and featured Farrah Fawcett and Pat Boone. The eight extra minutes of footage were filmed on March 15, 1971.

Sherman's and Stern's characters were reportedly based on the real-life songwriting team of Boyce and Hart, who had written hits for the Monkees ("Last Train to Clarksville", "Valleri"), Jay and the Americans ("Come a Little Bit Closer") and others. New music was a staple of the series, provided by much of the same team that had created the Partridge Family music. Most of these songs were from Sherman's album Getting Together, though a few songs were from his other albums (and some songs have never been released).

Cast
Bobby Sherman as Bobby Conway 
Wes Stern as Lionel Poindexter 
Susan Neher as Jennifer Conway 
Jack Burns as Officer Rudy Colcheck 
Pat Carroll as Rita Simon

Episodes

Reception
Airing in the same time slot as breakout CBS hit All in the Family, the show never gained sufficient ratings and was canceled at midseason after 14 episodes. Though Getting Together is a spin-off of The Partridge Family, the series is not included in the parent show's DVD collections.

References

External links

1971 American television series debuts
1972 American television series endings
1970s American musical comedy television series
1970s American sitcoms
American Broadcasting Company original programming
American television spin-offs
English-language television shows
Television series by Sony Pictures Television
Television shows set in California